Alfred Cecil Harwood *05.01.1898 London (UK) †22.12.1975 Forest Row Sussex was a lecturer, Waldorf teacher, writer, editor and anthroposophist.

Cecil Harwood was the youngest of five children born into the household of a pastor. He attended school together with Owen Barfield, who became his life-long friend and co-worker in many areas of his life. Together they studied at Oxford University and were part of the circle of the Inklings that included C.S. Lewis and J.R.R Tolkien. His friendship with Daphne Olivier, who later became his wife, led him to meet Rudolf Steiner and subsequently, to found the first Waldorf school in England, the so-called “New School” that later became Michael Hall, together with her and three other colleagues. He remained connected to the school for the rest his life.

Daphne and he had had five children and had worked together for over 25 years when she died in 1950. In the meantime, in 1948, a Swedish/English eurythmist by the name of Marguerite Lundgren had begun working in England, who was dedicated to English-language eurythmy and had become friends with both Owen Barfield and the Harwoods. She and Harwood married in 1953, beginning another fruitful co-work as they built up the eurythmy work in England with performances, international tours, the London School of Eurythmy and finally the book on which they collaborated with Marjorie Raffé, Eurythmy and the Impulse of Dance.

Harwood had joined the Anthroposophical Society in Great Britain shortly after meeting Rudolf Steiner for the first time in 1924. In 1937 he became its chairman and General Secretary, a position he carried until 1974. In this capacity he was instrumental not just in developing the work in the United Kingdom but also in re-establishing the international relationships within the Anthroposophical Society as a whole after the internal difficulties of the 1930s and 1940s. This implied a certain amount of travel, which he undertook not just on behalf of the Society but also in assisting the growth and development of Waldorf education worldwide and in particular, in the United States.

He was founder and for many years editor of Child and Man, the journal of the Waldorf Steiner schools in Great Britain, as well as writing one of the definitive works on Waldorf Education for the English-speaking world: The Recovery of Man in Childhood. Besides this, he translated into English certain central works of Anthroposophical life from Rudolf Steiner’s original formulations. These were the Calendar of the Soul, a cycle of meditations through the changing seasons of the year; the Services of The Christian Community and the three texts of the Oberuferer Weihenachtsspiele, traditional Christmas plays from the village of Oberufer in today’s Slovakia.

His friendship with Owen Barfield and C.S. Lewis has been well-recorded in the biographies written on these two personalities. It seems to have been a fruitful relationship throughout, influencing the work and thought of all three.

He went mysteriously blind in the course of holding a lecture in 1975 and died not long after in South Harbour, the house he and Marguerite had shared in Forest Row.

References

Published work

The Recovery of Man in Childhood: A Study of the Educational Work of Rudolf Steiner by Cecil Harwood, Hodder & Stoughton (1959)  ASIN B001DHY9CY
Centenary Essays on the Work and Thought of Rudolf Steiner, 1861-1925 Edited by A.C. Harwood. Hodder and Stoughton. 1961  ASIN B00109TGNW
Shakespeare's prophetic mind by Cecil Harwood. Rudolf Steiner Press 1964  ASIN B005OWGHF6

1898 births
1975 deaths
Writers from London
Anthroposophists
Inklings
People from Forest Row